The Nightmare Before Christmas is the fifteenth soundtrack album by American composer Danny Elfman.  It was released on October 12, 1993, by Walt Disney Records to promote the 1993 American stop-motion animated musical dark fantasy film The Nightmare Before Christmas. Composed by Danny Elfman, the soundtrack was nominated for the 1993 Golden Globe for Best Original Score. The album peaked at #64 on the US Billboard 200. For the film's 2006 re-release in Disney Digital 3-D, a special edition of the soundtrack was released, a bonus disc which contained covers of five of the film's songs by Fall Out Boy, Panic! at the Disco, Marilyn Manson, Fiona Apple and She Wants Revenge. Four original demo tracks (six on the Best Buy exclusive) by Elfman were also included.

Background
The soundtrack was composed by composer and then-Oingo Boingo frontman Danny Elfman. Elfman sought to make the soundtrack timeless and drew on classic popular composers for inspiration. He explained: "I wanted it to sound like it was written 50 or 100 years ago, so I turned my own influences for that stuff. Kurt Weill's The Threepenny Opera, which was a major thing in my life, was a source, as well musicals from Cole Porter and Gershwin, and to a certain extent, Rodgers and Hammerstein." For "What's This?" Elfman sought to capture the rapid-pace lyricism of Gilbert and Sullivan.

In a later interview, Elfman likened Jack Skellington's experience as the leader of Halloweentown looking to escape to a different world to his discontentment with being the leader of his band, Oingo Boingo. He recalled, "'I always felt Jack was a part of me. ... When I wrote those songs, I was in kind of a unique position, because like Jack I was the king of my own little kingdom – that was Oingo Boingo. And like Jack, I really wanted a way out, but I didn't know how to get out because so many people depended on me. So my own psychological mindset at the time was that I was writing from my own perspective as much as his, because I understood what it felt like to want something else."

Track listing 

On some versions of the CD, "End Credits" is two tracks (20 and 21) with lengths of 1:10 and 3:55 respectively. In this case, track 21 is considered a "hidden track" but features the same music as the 20-track release, which keeps "End Credits" as one track.

2006 reissue bonus disc 

The "Kidnap the Sandy Claws" and "This Is Halloween" demos are reversed in the track listing on the backside of the album cover and in the album booklet.

Personnel 
Credits and personnel adapted from the 2006 edition of the soundtrack's liner notes.

Performers 

Danny Elfman – principal artist (Jack Skellington, Barrell), vocals
Catherine O'Hara – principal artist (Sally, Shock), vocals
Glenn Shadix – principal artist (Mayor), vocals
Ken Page – principal artist (Oogie Boogie), vocals
Paul Reubens – principal artist (Lock), vocals
Ed Ivory – principal artist (Santa), vocals

Additional performers 
 Sherwood Ball – background vocals
 Debi Durst – background vocals
 Randy Crenshaw – background vocals
 Kerry Katz – background vocals
 Susan McBride – background vocals
 Bobbi Page – background vocals
 Greg Proops - background vocals
 Carmen Twillie – background vocals
 Glenn Walters – background vocals

Musicians 

 Steve Bartek – musical director, song orchestration
 Mark McKenzie – score orchestration
 Chris Boardman – song conductor
 J.A.C. Redford – score conductor
 Mark Mann – additional orchestration

Technical 
 Danny Elfman – producer
 Bob Badami – associate producer, music editor
 Richard Kraft – associate producer
 Bill Jackson – vocal recording engineer
 Robert Fernandez – song recording engineer
 Shawn Murphy – song and score recording engineer, audio mixing
 Sharone Rice – assistant engineer
 Bill Easystone – assistant engineer
 Mike Piersante – assistant engineer
 Andy Bass – assistant engineer
 Dave Collins – digital editing, mastering engineer
 Letitia Rogers – assistant music editor
 Bobbi Page – vocal contractor
 Patti Zimmitti – orchestra contractor
 Marc Mann – music preparation
 Joel Franklin – music copyist
 Megan Cavallari – demo assistant
 Gary Adler – art director

Bonus Content 

1. "This Is Halloween"
 Produced and Mixed by Marilyn Manson and Tim Skold

2. "Sally's Song"
 Produced by Mike Elizondo
 Mixed by Adam Hawkins
 Engineered by Adam Hawkins @ Phantom Studio, Westlake Village, CA
 Assistant Engineer: Erin J. Funk-Dublan
 Keyboards: Zac Rae
 Upright Bass: Mike Elizondo
 Drums: Charley Drayton
 Strings: The Section Quartet - Eric Gorfain, Daphne Chen, Leah Katz, Richard Dodd
 String Arrangement by Eric Gorfain
 Project Coordinator: Jolie Levine

3. "What's This?"
 Produced and Mixed by Neal Avron
 Recorded by Neal Avron and Erich Talaba
 Pro Tools Engineer: Matt Green
 Assistant Engineer: Zeph Sowers
 Recorded at The Pass Studios, Los Angeles, CA
 Mixed at Paramount Studios, Hollywood, CA
 Mix Assistant: George Gumbs

4. "Kidnap the Sandy Claws"
 Produced by KoRn

5. "This Is Halloween"
 Produced by Panic! At the Disco and Rob Mathes
 Vocals Arranged by Ryan Ross and Brendon Urie
 Recorded by Panic! At the Disco at Ryan's house Las Vegas, NV
 Orchestra Arranged and Conducted by Rob Mathes
 Recorded by Mark Mandelhaum, assisted by Alex Venguer at Legacy Recording Studio, New York, NY
 Concertmaster and Orchestra Contractor: Sandra Park
 Music Copyist: Mike and Lori Casteel
 Mixed by Chris Shaw at Avatar Studios, New York, NY

6-11. Demos
 All Demo Vocals Performed by Danny Elfman
 Synth Demo Tracks Arranged, Orchestrated and Performed by Danny Elfman
 Recorded by Bill Jackson
 Mixed by Noah Snyder
 Produced by Danny Elfman and Tim Burton

 A&R: Dani Markman
 Business affairs: Jeff Lowy
 Mastered by Pat Sullivan at Bernie Grundman Mastering, Hollywood, CA
 Creative Direction: Steve Gerdes
 Album Design: Greg Ross for Orabor

Foreign-language versions 

There are several foreign-language versions of the soundtrack, each features tracks sung by vocalists in their native language as well as original score tracks by Danny Elfman.
 French, L'Étrange Noël de Monsieur Jack
Jack - Olivier Constantin
Sally - Nina Morato
Oogie Boogie - Richard Darbois
Santa Claus (Père Noël) - Henri Poirier
 German, Nightmare Before Christmas
Jack - Alexander Goebel
Sally - Nina Hagen
Oogie Boogie - Ron Williams
Santa Claus - Manfred Lichtenfeld
 Italian, Nightmare Before Christmas
Jack - Renato Zero
Sally - Marjorie Biondo
Oogie Boogie (Bau-Bau) - Andrea Surdi
Santa Claus (Babbo Natale) - Silvio Spaccesi
 Japanese, ナイトメアー・ビフォア・クリスマス
Jack (ジャック) - Masachika Ichimura (市村正親)
Sally (サリー) - Yuko Doi (土居裕子)
Oogie Boogie (ブギー) - Kobayashi Atom (小林アトム)
Santa Claus (サンタクロース) - Tomoaki Nagae (永江智明)
 Castilian Spanish, Pesadilla Antes De Navidad
Jack - Tony Cruz
Sally - María Caneda
Oogie Boogie - Jesús Castejón
Santa Claus - Julio Núñez
 Latin American Spanish, El extraño mundo de Jack
Jack - Sergio Zaldivar
Sally - Gabriela Vega
Oogie Boogie - Rubén Cerda
Santa Claus - José Lavat
 Russian, Кошмар перед Рождеством
Jack (Джек) - Aleksej Kortnyev (Алексей Кортнев)
Sally (Салли) - Tutta Larsen (Тутта Ларсен)
Oogie Boogie (Бугимэн) - Nikolai Fomenko (Николай Фоменко)
Santa Claus (Санта-Клаус) - Sergej Mazayev (Сергей Мазаев)

Charts

Certifications

See also
 List of Billboard Top Holiday Albums number ones of the 2000s
 List of Billboard Top Holiday Albums number ones of the 2010s

References 

1993 soundtrack albums
1990s film soundtrack albums
Danny Elfman soundtracks
Albums produced by Danny Elfman
Disney film soundtracks
Disney animation soundtracks
The Nightmare Before Christmas
Walt Disney Records soundtracks
Halloween albums